The Communauté de communes des 4 rivières is a communauté de communes in the Seine-Maritime and Eure départements and in the Normandy région of France. It was formed on 1 January 2017 by the merger of the former Communauté de communes du Bray-Normand, Communauté de communes du Canton de Forges-les-Eaux and Communauté de communes des Monts et de l'Andelle on 1 January 2017. It consists of 53 communes (of which 1 in Eure), and its seat is in Gournay-en-Bray. Its area is 607.3 km2, and its population was 29,270 in 2019.

Composition
The communauté de communes consists of the following 53 communes, of which 52 in the Seine-Maritime department and 1 (Bouchevilliers) in Eure:

Argueil
Avesnes-en-Bray
Beaubec-la-Rosière
Beaussault
Beauvoir-en-Lyons
La Bellière
Bézancourt
Bosc-Hyons
Bouchevilliers
Brémontier-Merval
La Chapelle-Saint-Ouen
Compainville
Croisy-sur-Andelle
Cuy-Saint-Fiacre
Dampierre-en-Bray
Doudeauville
Elbeuf-en-Bray
Ernemont-la-Villette
Ferrières-en-Bray
La Ferté-Saint-Samson
La Feuillie
Forges-les-Eaux
Fry
Gaillefontaine
Gancourt-Saint-Étienne
Gournay-en-Bray
Grumesnil
La Hallotière
Haucourt
Haussez
La Haye
Le Héron
Hodeng-Hodenger
Longmesnil
Mauquenchy
Ménerval
Mésangueville
Le Mesnil-Lieubray
Mesnil-Mauger
Molagnies
Montroty
Morville-sur-Andelle
Neuf-Marché
Nolléval
Pommereux
Roncherolles-en-Bray
Rouvray-Catillon
Saint-Lucien
Saint-Michel-d'Halescourt
Saumont-la-Poterie
Serqueux
Sigy-en-Bray
Le Thil-Riberpré

References 

4 rivières
4 rivières
4 rivières